Chief Ayotunde Rosiji (24 February 1917 – 31 July 2000) was a Nigerian politician, having served as Minister for Health and Minister of Information.

He was born in Abeokuta, Ogun State, on 24 February 1917 to the family of an Egba policeman. Rosiji attended Christ Church Primary School, Abeokuta, and then Ibadan Grammar School and Government College, Ibadan, for secondary education. He was also educated at the Yaba Higher College, where he received a civil engineering certificate. He subsequently went abroad to study for a law degree at the University of London in London, England after working at Shell Nigeria as an engineer. Returning to Nigeria, he became one of the founding members of the Action Group.

Oloye Rosiji died on 31 July 2000.

References

 Nina Mba, Ayo Rosiji, A Man with Vision
 Rosalynde Ainslie, Catherine Hoskyns, Ronald Segal, Political Africa: A Who's Who of Personalities and Parties, Frederick A. Praeger, 1961

Alumni of the University of London
Health ministers of Nigeria
Federal ministers of Nigeria
Yoruba politicians
Action Group (Nigeria) politicians
Politicians from Abeokuta
2000 deaths
Egbe Omo Oduduwa politicians
Ibadan Grammar School alumni
Government College, Ibadan alumni
Egba people
Yaba Higher College alumni
1917 births